Lorna Sage (13 January 1943 – 11 January 2001) was an English academic, literary critic and author, remembered especially for contributing to consideration of women's writing and for a memoir of her early life, Bad Blood (2000). She taught English literature at the University of East Anglia.

Biography
Sage was born in Hanmer, a village on the Anglo-Welsh border, as the eldest child of Valma (née Meredith-Morris) and Eric Stockton, a haulage contractor, then serving as a second lieutenant in the Royal Welch Fusiliers. She was named after the title character of R. D. Blackmore's novel Lorna Doone. As her father was away serving in the war, she was initially raised in her grandparents' home in Flintshire, North Wales, where her grandfather was at once an Anglican clergyman and a ladies' man and drinker disliked by his wife. She attended a nearby Flintshire village school, then the Girls' High School in Whitchurch, Shropshire.

Lorna Stockton became pregnant by Victor Sage and they married in 1959 when she was 16. Their daughter Sharon was born in 1960, after which the couple managed to continue their education. Lorna Sage won a scholarship to read English at Durham University, after the university's St Aidan's College changed its admission rules to admit married students. They both graduated in 1964 with first class honours, an event reported on the front page of the Daily Mail at the time. Although the couple divorced in 1974, they remained friends. Sage later received an MA from the University of Birmingham for her thesis entitled "Poems on Poetry in the 17th Century".

Academic life
Sage's spent her entire academic career at the University of East Anglia, where she became Professor of English Literature in 1994. She was twice Dean of the School of English and American Studies (in 1985–1988 and 1993–1996). She edited The Cambridge Guide to Women's Writing in English in 1999, which has become a standard work. As she wrote in the Preface: "In concentrating on women's writing... you stress the extent and pace of change, for the scale of women's access to literary life has reflected and accelerated democratic, diasporic pressures in the modern world."

Sage's book reviews appeared in the London Review of Books, The Times Literary Supplement, The New York Times Book Review and The Observer, mentioning the works of Angela Carter and covering studies of works of authors who included Christina Stead, Doris Lessing, Thomas Love Peacock, John Milton and Thomas Hardy.

Sage married Rupert Hodson in 1979 after meeting him in Florence on a sabbatical. The couple rented a house near Florence from Harry Brewster, where Sage wrote outside academic terms.

Autobiography
Sage's childhood is recounted in her memoir Bad Blood (2000), which traces her disappointment in a family where warped behaviour passed down from generation to generation. The book won the Whitbread Biography Award on 3 January 2001.

A week later Sage died in London as a result of emphysema, from which she had suffered for some years. She left behind the draft of the first part of a work on Plato and Platonism in literature, which, according to her former husband in 2001, she had been working on intermittently for many years. The posthumous collection Moments of Truth partly consists of reprinted introductions to classic works.

Publications
Peacock: The Satirical Novels (1976)
Doris Lessing (1983)
Last Edwardians: An Illustrated History of Violet Trefusis & Alice Keppel (1985)
Angela Carter (1990)
Women in the House of Fiction (1992)
Flesh and the Mirror; Essays on the Art of Angela Carter (1994)
The Cambridge Guide to Women's Writing in English (1999)
Bad Blood (2000)
Moments of Truth: Twelve Twentieth Century Women Writers (2001): a collection of literary essays
Good as her word: Selected Journalism (2004)

References

External links
Bio at West Midlands Literary Heritage
List of Lorna Sage articles, London Review of Books archive
Lorna Sage, "Past Imperfect", The Guardian, 12 January 2001 (her last article)
"Tributes to 'brilliant' Sage", BBC News, 12 January 2001
Lorna Sage Archive, University of East Anglia
Lorna Sage: Bad Blood An Exhibition, Sharon Tolaini-Sage (curator) with University of East Anglia

1943 births
2001 deaths
Academics of the University of East Anglia
Alumni of the University of Birmingham
British biographers
British journalists
20th-century biographers
20th-century British women writers
British women memoirists
People from Whitchurch, Shropshire
People from Flintshire
Deaths from emphysema
20th-century British journalists
Alumni of St Aidan's College, Durham